King's Bruton is an independent fully co-educational secondary boarding and day school in the English public school tradition located in Bruton, Somerset, England. It was founded in 1519 by Richard FitzJames, and received royal foundation status around 30 years later in the reign of Edward VI. It is a member school of the Headmasters' and Headmistresses' Conference.

Girls have attended the school's sixth form since the 1960s before King's became fully co-educational in the late 1990s. It has six houses: Wellesley, Priory and Arion for girls, with New, Blackford and Lyon making up the boys' houses.

In September 1999, the Hobhouse Science centre was opened with a fully equipped observatory. The school has a purpose-built theatre, sports hall and fitness suite and sports surfaces for rugby, netball, tennis and cricket as well as two all-weather astro-turfs for hockey.

The Basil Wright Building was opened in 2009 and houses the Headmaster's, Bursar's and Registrar's offices.

King's School Bruton once owned a copy of Magna Carta dating from 1297, which it sold to the Australian Government in 1952 for £12,500.

Old House was the original school building, later New House was built as an extension for school rooms and Old House was the headmaster's house. The Memorial Hall was built in the 1920s to commemorate the members of the school who died in World War I. Blackford and Lyon were built and were funded by beneficiaries such as Lord Blackford and James Lyon.

On 28 March 2019, to mark the school's quincentenary, King's hosted Queen Elizabeth II during a wider Royal visit to the West Country. During the visit the Queen opened a new music school named in her honour.

Prep school
Hazlegrove Preparatory School in Sparkford is part of the King's School group and educates children aged 2 to 13, prior to attending King's School. Hazlegrove occupies the 17th century grade II listed building Hazlegrove House.

Senior Management Team

Combined Cadet Force
Kings runs a Combined Cadet Force contingent, it is commanded by a Major who takes the position of Contingent Commander and whose primary focus is on the Army Section. The Royal Navy Section is (as of December 2021) commanded by a (CCF) Sub-Lieutenant. The Naval Section is (as of December 2021) composed of four Non-Commissioned Officers, two Officers awaiting training and one Sub Lieutenant; the Navy is the smaller section of the two. The Army section comprises NCOs drawn from the Lower and Upper Sixth Form and around 11 Commissioned Officers. Commissioned Officers are all teachers or other staff already working at the school.

References

External links
King's Bruton
The Old Brutonians Association
Independent Schools Inspectorate Inspection Report 2003

Private schools in Somerset
Member schools of the Headmasters' and Headmistresses' Conference
Boarding schools in Somerset
Educational institutions established in the 1510s
1519 establishments in England
 
Church of England private schools in the Diocese of Bath and Wells
Bruton